Brimstone is an archaic name for sulfur, today most commonly associated with fire and brimstone, a biblical expression for God's wrath. It may also refer to:

Arts and entertainment
 Brimstone (1949 film), an American Western
 Brimstone (2016 film), a western thriller
 Brimstone (TV series), a short-lived supernatural TV series that aired in 1998–1999
 "Brimstone", a second season episode of Superboy
 Brimstone (DC Comics), several fictional characters
 Brimstone (Parker novel), a 2009 Western novel by Robert B. Parker
 Brimstone (Preston and Child novel), a 2004 novel by Douglas Preston and Lincoln Child
 A character in the Daughter of Smoke and Bone book series by Laini Taylor
 "Brimstone", a song from the album The Valley (2019) by Whitechapel
 A playable character in the video game Valorant by Riot Games
 An item in the video game ‘’The Binding of Isaac: Rebirth’’ by Edmund McMillen

Geography
 Brimstone, Ontario, Canada, a community
 Brimstone Creek, New York, United States
 Brimstone Peak (South Shetland Islands)
 Brimstone Peak (Victoria Land), Antarctica
 Brimstone Hill, on the island of Saint Kitts - see Brimstone Hill Fortress National Park

Species
 Brimstone canary, in the finch family
 Brimstone moth, a moth of the family Geometridae
 Gonepteryx, a genus of butterflies commonly known as the brimstones
 Gonepteryx rhamni, a species of Gonepteryx commonly known as the brimstone or common brimstone

Other uses
 Brimstone (missile), a surface- or air-launched weapon system
 Brimstone Cup, a soccer trophy awarded to the yearly winner of the Major League Soccer rivalry between Chicago Fire FC and FC Dallas

See also
 Fire and Brimstone (disambiguation)